The dihalomethanes are organic compounds in which two hydrogen atoms in methane are replaced by halogen atoms. They belong to the haloalkanes, specifically the subgroup of halomethanes, and contains ten members.

There are four members with only one kind of halogen atom: difluoromethane, dichloromethane, dibromomethane and diiodomethane.

There are six members with two kinds of halogen atoms:
 Bromochloromethane
 Bromofluoromethane
 Bromoiodomethane
 Chlorofluoromethane
 Chloroiodomethane
 Fluoroiodomethane

See also 
 Monohalomethane
 Trihalomethane
 Tetrahalomethane